The Sikorsky SH-3 Sea King (company designation S-61) is an American twin-engined anti-submarine warfare (ASW) helicopter designed and built by Sikorsky Aircraft. A landmark design, it was one of the first ASW rotorcraft to use turboshaft engines.

The Sea King has its origins in efforts by the United States Navy to counter the growing threat of Soviet submarines during the 1950s. Accordingly, the helicopter was specifically developed to deliver a capable ASW platform; in particular, it combined the roles of hunter and killer, which had previously been carried out by two separate helicopters. The Sea King was initially designated HSS-2, which was intended to imply a level of commonality to the earlier HSS-1; it was subsequently redesignated as the SH-3A during the early 1960s.

Introduced to service in 1961, it was operated by the United States Navy as a key ASW and utility asset for several decades prior to being replaced by the non-amphibious Sikorsky SH-60 Seahawk in the 1990s. In late 1961 and early 1962, a modified U.S. Navy HSS-2 Sea King was used to break the FAI 3 km, 100 km, 500 km, and 1000 km helicopter speed records. The Sea King also performed various other roles and missions such as search-and-rescue, transport, anti-shipping, medevac, plane guard, and airborne early warning operations.

The Sea King has also proved to be popular on the export market with foreign military customers, and has also been sold to civil operators as well. As of 2015, many examples of the type remain in service in nations around the world. The Sea King has been built under license by Agusta in Italy, Mitsubishi in Japan, and by Westland in the United Kingdom as the Westland Sea King. The major civil versions are the S-61L and S-61N.

Development

Origins
During the Cold War, the Soviet Navy built up a large and varied fleet of submarines which at one point was in excess of 200 operational submarines. The US Navy countered this threat by the improvement and development of various anti-submarine warfare (ASW) capabilities, which resulted in the development of the Sea King. During the late 1950s, the US Navy took advantage of recent aerospace advances, such as the turboshaft engine, by commissioning the development of a new large naval helicopter. Sikorsky received a request from the service to design a new turbine-powered helicopter that would be capable of performing the ASW mission.

In 1957, Sikorsky was awarded a contract to produce an all-weather amphibious helicopter for the US Navy. As per the earlier specification, this new rotorcraft was to excel at ASW; specifically, it would combine the roles of hunter and killer, as these two duties had previously been carried out by two separate helicopters. It was also the first helicopter to be procured under the US Navy's new weapon system concept, under which Sikorsky was responsible not only for the design and production of the airframe, but all major onboard systems, such as the sonar, navigational equipment, electronic devices, and support equipment. As such, the navigation suite for the rotorcraft was developed jointly by Sikorsky and the US Navy.

Key features of the emerging ASW helicopter included its amphibious hull, which enabled the rotorcraft to readily perform water landings, and its adoption of a twin-turboshaft engine arrangement that enabled it to be larger, heavier and better-equipped than had been possible with prior helicopters. The designation HSS-2 was applied, allegedly to imply a level of commonality to the earlier HSS-1, should political sentiment turn against the development of an entirely new rotorcraft. A total of ten prototypes were produced to support the development program.

Into flight

On 11 March 1959, the first prototype conducted its maiden flight. During early 1961, a pair of prototypes were stationed on board the aircraft carrier  to fulfill a demand for carrier suitability trials. Shortly after the completion of suitability trials, the US Navy formally accepted delivery of the first HSS-2 rotorcraft, which was subsequently re-designated as the SH-3A, in September 1961.

In late 1961 and early 1962, a modified US Navy HSS-2 Sea King was used to break the FAI 3 km, 100 km, 500 km and 1000 km helicopter speed records.

Further developments

The base design of the Sea King had proved sound and several aspects were judged to be potentially useful for other operators, thus Sikorsky elected to pursue the further development of the rotorcraft for other markets beyond the US Navy. One of the major variants of the Sea King to be produced was a model for civil operators, which was designated as the Sikorsky S-61L. The first operator of the S-61L was Los Angeles Airways, who introduced the type to service on 11 March 1962. Another noteworthy Sea King variant, the significant change this time being the adoption of a conventional fuselage, the Sikorsky S-61R, was also concurrently developed for transport and search and rescue (SAR) duties, this type being extensively operated by the U.S. Air Force and the U.S. Coast Guard.

In US Navy service, the initial SH-3A model of the Sea King would be progressively converted into the improved SH-3D and SH-3H variants; these featured more powerful engines and improved sensors that gave the type greater operational capabilities as an ASW platform. It was also common for Sea Kings to be converted for non-ASW activities, these roles included minesweeping, combat search and rescue, and as a cargo/passenger utility transport. The aircrew on ASW-tasked Sea Kings were routinely trained to carry out these secondary roles as aircraft could often be quickly adapted to perform different missions in the face of operational needs.

In addition to those Sea Kings that were manufactured by Sikorsky, several license agreements were enacted with other firms to produce the type. These included the Japanese conglomerate Mitsubishi and the Italian aerospace company Agusta. Another licensee was the British helicopter manufacturer Westland Helicopters, which substantially redesigned the Sea King to produce various models of their own, collectively referred to as the Westland Sea King. In contrast to the US Navy's Sea Kings, the Westland Sea King was intended for greater operational autonomy. In total, Westland produced 330 Sea Kings; outside of its British-based operators, various export customers were found for the Westland Sea King. including the Indian Naval Air Arm, the German Navy, the Royal Australian Navy, and the Royal Norwegian Air Force.

While Sikorsky opted to terminate its own Sea King production line during the 1970s, the type has had a lengthy service life. In September 2009, it was reported that nearly 600 Sea Kings were believed to still be operational.

Design
The Sikorsky SH-3 Sea King is a twin-engine medium-sized amphibious rotorcraft. Many of the features on board the Sea King represented a considerable advancement over preceding helicopters. In addition to being fully amphibious and capable of operating under all weather conditions, it is the first operational American helicopter to be able to simultaneously hunt and destroy submarines. Its twin-turboshaft powerplant layout gave the SH-3 a higher payload and greater reliability than previous anti-submarine helicopters. In the event of a single engine failing, the Sea King could continue flying on a single engine. The powerplant used on the Sea King was the General Electric T58-GE-8B, which was initially capable of generating up to  each.

In normal operations, the Sea King typically would have a four-man crew on board; these being a pilot and copilot in the cockpit, and two aircrew stationed within the main cabin area. When conducting anti-submarine missions, the rear aircrew operated the aircraft's sensors and interpreted the generated data. For search-and-rescue missions, the Sea King's cabin could accommodate up to 22 survivors. In a medical layout, a maximum of nine stretchers plus two medical officers could be carried. In the troop transport role, up to 28 soldiers can be accommodated.

The Sea King features many design elements to support naval-orientated operations. The main rotor blades and the tail section can be folded via fully automated systems for storage on board ships. The adoption of an amphibious hull allowed a Sea King to conduct a water landing and, being completely watertight, would enable the rotorcraft to remaining floating for prolonged periods on the ocean's surface. Deployable airbags in the aircraft's sponsons added to the rotorcraft's stability and buoyancy, resisting pitching and rolling. The hull design was compatible with landing on challenging terrain, including ice, snow, swamp land, and tundra. Wheels are installed in the sponsons for land operations.

The armament fitted upon a Sea King could vary considerably. For anti-submarine missions, the aircraft could carry up to four torpedoes or four depth charges. For anti-ship duties, some models were outfitted to carry one or two missiles, typically Sea Eagles or Exocets. The Sea King could also be fitted to deploy the B57 nuclear bomb. ASW equipment used on Sea Kings has included the AQS-13A/B/E dipping sonar which included specialized computers for processing sonar and sonobuoy data, various models of sonobuoys, ARR-75 Sonobuoy Receivers, and the ASQ-81 magnetic anomaly detector. The commonly fitted AKT-22 data link enabled the rapid dissemination of sonar information to other friendly elements. Some later Sea King models featured the TACNAV digital navigation system (first generation GPS) and overhauled cockpit instrumentation for night vision compatibility.

Operational history

During June 1961, the Sea King became operational with the US Navy as the HSS-2; at the time, it was not only the largest amphibious helicopter in the world, but was also the first all-weather rotorcraft to reach production status for the US Navy. When the unified aircraft designation system was introduced, the rotorcraft's designation wa changed to SH-3A. It was used primarily for anti-submarine warfare: the largely involved the detection and tracking of Soviet submarines. In the event of open warfare breaking out between the two powers, Sea Kings would have been used to attack these submarines with the intent to sink them.

The Sea King was able to operate from the flight decks of many of the US Navy's vessels as well as shore bases. It could also operate from offshore platforms to extend their surveillance and strike ranges. The type was capable of conducting nighttime ASW operations, albeit these usually posed considerable difficulty for the flight crew.

The Sea King also performed various other roles and missions such as search-and-rescue, transport, anti-shipping and airborne early warning operations. Aircraft carriers would typically deploy Sea Kings to operate near the carrier as a plane guard, ready to rescue air crew who crashed during takeoff or landing. They were routinely used in a logistical capacity at sea, transferring personnel, mail, and other lighter cargoes between vessels.

The Royal Canadian Navy (RCN) became a major operator of the Sea King (see Sikorsky CH-124 Sea King) following its introduction to service in 1963. It remained Canada's dominant maritime helicopter for over 50 years, finally being withdrawn in 2018. One notable innovation in Canadian operations, which was subsequently adopted by several other nations, was the use of a winch 'hauldown' landing and securing method, referred to as a 'Beartrap'. This device considerably increased the ability of Sea Kings to land in difficult conditions, such as on small flight decks or during poor weather conditions.

The Sea King was exported in large numbers to various nations, such as Brazil, Italy, Japan and the United Kingdom. Several operators have kept their Sea Kings in use for more than 50 years.

During the Vietnam War, SH-3s rescued the crews of downed aircraft at sea and over land, typically being equipped with self-sealing fuel tanks, multiple machine guns and heavy armor when performing such missions. Due to the type's greater range and the safety of having two engines, it was often used during rescue sorties into North Vietnam to retrieve downed aircrew. The Sea King was also used for medical evacuations and disaster relief efforts.

The SH-3 was the primary helicopter for retrieving manned space capsules starting with Mercury-Atlas 7 in May 1962. Helicopter 66 was the primary recovery vehicle for Apollo missions 8 and 10 to 13. In February 1971, an SH-3A, operating from the amphibious assault ship USS New Orleans, recovered Apollo 14. A specialist search and rescue variant of the SH-3, the HH-3, also performed in this capacity.

Several Sea Kings, operated by the United States Marine Corps's HMX-1 unit, are used as the official helicopters of the President of the United States; in this capacity, the call sign 'Marine One' is used by the helicopter currently occupied by the President. As of 2012, a replacement helicopter fleet for the Sea King was pending under the VXX program. In 1992, the US Justice Department sued Sikorsky over allegations of overcharged component pricing and deliberately misleading US Navy negotiators. In 1997, the Justice Department issued further accusations against Sikorsky of willful overcharging on a contract to upgrade the Navy's Sea Kings.

During the 1990s, the Sea King was replaced in the ASW and SAR roles by the U.S. Navy with the newer Sikorsky SH-60 Sea Hawk. However, the SH-3 continued to operate in reserve units in roles including logistical support, search and rescue, and transport. On 27 January 2006, the SH-3 was ceremonially retired at NAS Norfolk, Virginia, by Helicopter Combat Support Squadron 2 (HC-2). They have been replaced by increasingly advanced variants of the SH-60 Sea Hawk. In the early 21st century, following their drawdown in US service, there have been a number of initiatives to refurbish ex-military Sea Kings for continued operations; in addition to civil operators, nations such as Egypt and India acquired refurbished former US Sea Kings to supplement their own aging fleets.

Variants

US military
XHSS-2 The only prototype of the H-3 Sea King.
YHSS-2 Pre-production S-61 aircraft, seven built for the U.S. Navy, re-designated YSH-3A in 1962.
HSS-2 Original designation of the Sea King. Changed to SH-3A by the 1962 United States Tri-Service aircraft designation system
SH-3A  Anti-submarine warfare helicopter for the U.S. Navy; 245 built. Originally designated HSS-2.
HH-3A Combat search and rescue helicopter for the U.S. Navy. 12 converted from SH-3A.
CH-3A Military transport version for the U.S. Air Force; three converted from SH-3As into CH-3A configuration; they later became CH-3Bs.
NH-3A (S-61F) Experimental high-speed compound helicopter, with extensive streamlining, no floats, short wings carrying two turbojet engines for extra speed; one converted from SH-3A. Later modified with a tail rotor able to rotate 90° to serve as a pusher propeller; this helicopter demonstrated "Roto-Prop" pusher propeller for Sikorsky's S-66 design.
RH-3A Minesweeper helicopter for the U.S. Navy. Nine converted from SH-3A aircraft.
VH-3A VIP transport (Better known as Marine One or Army One 1957–1976.) helicopter for the U.S. Army and Marine Corps; originally designated HSS-2Z. Eight built, plus two SH-3A conversions rebuilt from damaged helicopters (one YHSS-2 and one SH-3A). The rest were returned to the U.S. Navy in 1975–76 and replaced by the VH-3D.
CH-3B Military transport helicopter for the U.S. Air Force.
SH-3D Anti-submarine warfare helicopter for the U.S. Navy. 73 built and two conversions from SH-3As.
VH-3D VIP Presidential transport helicopter (better known as Marine One) for the U.S. Marine Corps, 11 built. It entered service in 1976.
SH-3G Cargo, utility transport helicopter for the U.S. Navy. 105 conversions from SH-3A and SH-3D.
SH-3H Upgrade of the SH-3G as an anti-submarine warfare (ASW) helicopter for the U.S. Navy. It included SH-3G features with improvements for ASW, anti-ship missile detection and other airframe improvements. 163 SH-3A/D/Gs were upgraded to SH-3H configuration.
SH-3H AEW Airborne early warning version for the Spanish navy.
UH-3H Cargo, utility transport version for the U.S. Navy; converted from SH-3H by removing ASW systems.

Sikorsky designations
S-61 Company designation for the Sea King.
S-61A Export version for the Royal Danish Air Force. Wider pontoons without flotation bags, a 530-liter center tank instead of a dipping sonar and no automatic powered folding system.
S-61A-4 Nuri Military transport, search and rescue helicopter for the Royal Malaysian Air Force. It can seat up to 31 combat troops. 38 built.
S-61A/AH Utility helicopter for survey work and search and rescue in the Antarctic.
S-61B Export version of the SH-3 anti-submarine warfare helicopter for the Japanese Maritime Self Defense Force.
S-61D-3 Export version for the Brazilian Navy.
S-61D-4 Export version for the Argentine Navy.
S-61NR Search and rescue version for the Argentine Air Force.
S-61V Company designation for the VH-3A. One built for Indonesia.

S-61L/N

Civil versions of the Sea King.
S-61R

The S-61R served in the United States Air Force as the CH-3C/E Sea King and the HH-3E Jolly Green Giant, and with the United States Coast Guard and the Italian Air Force as the HH-3F Sea King (more commonly referred to by the nickname "Pelican").

United Aircraft of Canada

CH-124 Anti-submarine warfare helicopter for the Royal Canadian Navy (41 assembled by United Aircraft of Canada).
CH-124A The Sea King Improvement Program (SKIP) added modernized avionics as well as improved safety features.
CH-124B Alternate version of the CH-124A without a dipping sonar but formerly with a MAD sensor and additional storage for deployable stores. In 2006, the five aircraft of this variant were converted to support the Standing Contingency Task Force (SCTF), and were modified with additional troop seats, and frequency agile radios. Plans to add fast-rope capability, EAPSNIPS (Engine Air Particle Separator / Snow & Ice Particle Separator) did not come to fruition.
CH-124B2 Six CH-124Bs were upgraded to the CH-124B2 standard in 1991–1992. The revised CH-124B2 retained the sonobuoy processing gear to passively detect submarines but was also fitted with a towed-array sonar to supplement the ship's sonar. Since anti-submarine warfare is no longer a major priority within the Canadian Forces, the CH-124B2 were refitted again to become improvised troop carriers for the newly formed Standing Contingency Task Force.
CH-124C One CH-124 operated by the Helicopter Operational Test and Evaluation Facility located at CFB Shearwater. Used for testing new gear, and when not testing new gear, it is deployable to any Canadian Forces ship requiring a helicopter.
CH-124U Unofficial designation for four CH-124s that were modified for passenger/freight transport. One crashed in 1973, and the survivors were later refitted to become CH-124A's.

Westland

The Westland Sea King variant was manufactured under license by Westland Helicopters Ltd in the United Kingdom, who developed a specially modified version for the Royal Navy. It is powered by a pair of Rolls-Royce Gnome turbines (license-built T58s), and has British avionics and ASW equipment. This variant first flew in 1969, and entered service the next year. It was until 2017 also used by the Royal Air Force in a search and rescue capacity, and has been sold to many countries around the world.

Agusta
AS-61 Company designation for the H-3 Sea King built under license in Italy by Agusta.
AS-61A-1 Italian export model for the Royal Malaysian Air Force.
AS-61A-4 Military transport, search and rescue helicopter.
AS-61N-1 Silver License built model of the S-61N, with a shortened cabin.
AS-61R version basing upon Sikorsky S-61R
AS-61VIP VIP transport helicopter.
ASH-3A (SH-3G) Utility transport helicopter
ASH-3D Anti-submarine warfare helicopter. Flown by the Italian, Brazilian, Iranian, Peruvian and Argentinian navies.
ASH-3TS VIP, executive transport mission helicopter. Also known as the ASH-3D/TS, the Italian Air Force operated 2 from 1975 until 2012.
ASH-3H Anti-submarine warfare helicopter.

Mitsubishi
S-61A License-built version of the S-61A as Search-and-Rescue and Utility helicopters for the Japan Maritime Self Defense Force. 18 built.
HSS-2 License-built version of the S-61B as an anti-submarine warfare helicopter for the Japan Maritime Self Defense Force. 55 built.
HSS-2A License-built version of the S-61B(SH-3D) as an anti-submarine warfare helicopter for the Japan Maritime Self Defense Force. 28 built.
HSS-2B License-built version of the S-61B(SH-3H) as an anti-submarine warfare helicopter for the Japan Maritime Self Defense Force. 23 built.

Operators

Argentine Naval Aviation 

Indian Navy

National Disaster Management Authority – An S-61A is leased from Cardig Air.

Iranian Navy

Malaysian Army Aviation – ex-RMAF

Peruvian Navy

United States Marine Corps
HMX-1

Venezuelan Army

Former

Brazilian Navy

Royal Canadian Navy – transferred to Air Command in 1968
Royal Canadian Air Force (See: CH-124 Sea King) – retired in December 2018

Royal Danish Air Force

Iraqi Air Force

Italian Air Force – retired in September 2014
Italian Navy – retired in June 2013

Japan Maritime Self Defense Force

Royal Malaysian Air Force –  some helicopter transferred to Malaysian Army Aviation

Royal Saudi Air Force

Spanish Navy

L.A. County Sheriff's Department
United States Navy

Aircraft on display
Argentina
 0675 – S-61D-4 on static display at the Argentine Naval Aviation Museum in Bahia Blanca, Buenos Aires.

Denmark
 U-240 – S-61A on static display at the Danmarks Flymuseum in Skjern, Central Denmark.

United States

 147140 – HH-3A on static display at the Pacific Missile Range Facility in Kekaha, Hawaii.
 148038 – SH-3A on static display at the Patuxent River Naval Air Museum in Lexington Park, Maryland.
 148042 – UH-3H on static display at Naval Station Norfolk in Norfolk, Virginia.
 148999 – SH-3H on static display at the USS Hornet Museum in Alameda, California.
 149006 – UH-3H on static display at the Evergreen Aviation & Space Museum in McMinnville, Oregon. It is painted as Apollo 11 recovery helicopter.
 149695 – SH-3G on static display at Naval Air Station Jacksonville in Jacksonville, Florida.
 149711 – SH-3H on static display at the USS Midway Museum in San Diego, California.
 149738 – SH-3H in storage at the Quonset Air Museum in North Kingston, Rhode Island.
 149932 – SH-3G on static display at the Patriots Point in Charleston, South Carolina.
 150611 – VH-3A on static display at the Ronald Reagan Presidential Library in Simi Valley, California.
 150613 – VH-3A on static display at the National Naval Aviation Museum in Pensacola, Florida.
 150617 – VH-3A on static display at the Richard Nixon Presidential Library and Museum in Yorba Linda, California.
 156484 – SH-3D on static display at the National Naval Aviation Museum in Pensacola, Florida.
 Unknown BuNo – SH-3 on static display at the Hickory Aviation Museum in Hickory, North Carolina.

Specifications (SH-3D)

See also

References

Notes

Bibliography

Andrade, John. Militair 1982. London: Aviation Press, 1982. 
Biass, Eric H. World Helicopter Systems. Geneva, Switzerland: Interavia Data, 1985.
Bishop, Chris and Chris Chant. Aircraft Carriers. Minneapolis, Minnesota: Zenith Imprint, 2004. .
Blair, Don. Splashdown! Nasa and the Navy. Nashville, Tennessee: Turner Publishing, 2004. .
Byers, R.B. The Denuclearisation of the Oceans. London: Taylor & Francis, 1986. .
Chant, Christopher. A Compendium of Armaments and Military Hardware. London: Routledge, 1988. .
Chesneau, Roger. Aeroguide 10: Westland Sea King HAR Mk 3. Essex, UK: Linewrights, 1985. .
DOD 4120.15-L Model Designation of Military Aircraft, Rockets, and Guided Missiles. Washington, D.C.: Department of Defense, 1974.
DOD 4120.15-L Model Designation of Military Aircraft, Rockets, and Guided Missiles. Washington, D.C.: Department of Defense, 1998.
DOD 4120.15-L Model Designation of Military Aircraft, Rockets, and Guided Missiles. Washington, D.C.: Department of Defense, 2004.
Donald, David, ed. The Complete Encyclopedia of World Aircraft. New York: Barnes & Noble Books, 1997. .

Fieldhouse, Richard and Taoka Shunji. Superpowers at Sea: An Assessment of the Naval Arms Race. Oxford, UK: Oxford University Press, 1989. .
Frawley, Gerard. The International Directory of Civil Aircraft, 2003–2004. Fyshwick, Australian Capital Territory: Aerospace Publications Pty Ltd, 2003. .
Jackson, Robert, ed. "Sikorsky S-61/SH-3 Sea King." Helicopters: Military, Civilian, and Rescue Rotorcraft (The Aviation Factfile). London: Grange Books Ltd, 2005. .
Lake, Jon. "Westland Sea King: Variant Briefing". World Air Power Journal, Volume 25, Summer 1996, pp. 110–135. London: Aerospace Publishing. . .
Leoni, Ron D. Black Hawk: The Story of a World Class Helicopter. Reston, Virginia: American Institute of Aeronautics and Astronautics, 2007. .
Marolda, Edward J. By Sea, Air, and Land: An Illustrated History of the U. S. Navy and the War in Southeast Asia. Darby, Pennsylvania: DIANE Publishing, 1996. .
McGowen, Stanley S. Helicopters: An Illustrated History of their Impact. Santa Barbara, California: ABC-CLIO, 2005. .
Mutza, Wayne. Helicopter Gunships: Deadly Combat Weapon Systems. Specialty Press, 2010. .
Uttley, Matthew. Westland and the British Helicopter Industry, 1945–1960: Licensed Production versus Indigenous Innovation. London: Routledge, 2001. .
Williamson, Ronald M. Naval Air Station Jacksonville, Florida, 1940–2000: An Illustrated History. Nashville, Tennessee: Turner Publishing, 2000. .

Further reading

External links

S-61 Specs & Photo on flugzeuginfo.net
HELIS.com Sikorsky S-61/H-3/HSS-2 Database

United States military helicopters
1950s United States anti-submarine aircraft
1950s United States military utility aircraft
Amphibious helicopters
1950s United States helicopters
Twin-turbine helicopters
Aircraft first flown in 1959
SH-3 Sea King
Anti-submarine helicopters